The National Trout Festival is an annual festival held in Kalkaska, Michigan the last full weekend in April to celebrate the opening of trout season in Michigan. The 86th National Trout Festival will be held 19–23 April 2023. 2020 was cancelled as the COVID-19 pandemic was to blame. It was also cancelled for two years during World War II.

Events of the National Trout Festival include a fishing contest for children aged 16 and younger, a carnival, parades, fireworks, motor sports and live music.

References

External links
 National Trout Festival Official Website

Festivals in Michigan
Tourist attractions in Kalkaska County, Michigan